Oratório Recreativo Clube, commonly referred to as Oratório, is a Brazilian football club based in Macapá, Amapá. The team competes in the Campeonato Amapaense, the top division in the Amapá state football league system.

The men's team won the Campeonato Amapaense once. The women's team competed twice in the Copa do Brasil de Futebol Feminino.

History
The club was founded on August 15, 1969, by member of the Nossa Senhora da Conceição Church community.

Stadium

Like other clubs in the state, Oratório does not have its own stadium. Since 2017, all football matches in Amapá are held at Zerão. Up until 2014, the team also played at Glicerão, which is currently undergoing renovation.

Men's team 
Oratório was the first club from Amapá to compete in the Copa São Paulo de Juniores, participating in 2001. They won the Campeonato Amapaense in 2012.

Women's team 
They competed in the Copa do Brasil de Futebol Feminino in 2009, when they were eliminated by Pinheirense, and in 2010, when they were eliminated by Roraima

Honours

State 

 Campeonato Amapaense
 Champions: 2012

Notes

References 

Football clubs in Amapá
Women's football clubs in Brazil
Association football clubs established in 1969
1969 establishments in Brazil